Tapinoma schultzei is a species of ant in the genus Tapinoma. Described by Forel in 1910, the species is endemic to the Botswana, Kenya and Zimbabwe.

References

Tapinoma
Hymenoptera of Africa
Insects described in 1910